Minuscule 370 (in the Gregory-Aland numbering), Θε41 (Soden), is a Greek minuscule manuscript of the New Testament, on paper. Palaeographically it has been assigned to the 14th century.
The manuscript has no complex context. It contains marginalia.

Description 

The codex contains the text of the four Gospels on 437 paper leaves with lacunae (Matthew 1:1-17; John 16:29-21:25). The text is written in one column per page, in 34 lines per page.

There is also a division according to the Ammonian Sections, (no references to the Eusebian Canons).

It contains Argumentum, lectionary markings at the margin, a Commentary of Theophylact.

Kurt Aland did not place the Greek text of the codex in any Category.
It was not examined by using t Claremont Profile Method.

History 

The manuscript was described by Giovanni Lami in 1738 (like codices 201, 362).  It was added to the list of New Testament manuscripts by Scholz (1794-1852). 
It was examined by Burgon. C. R. Gregory saw it in 1886.

The manuscript is currently housed at the Biblioteca Riccardiana (5) in Florence.

See also 

 List of New Testament minuscules
 Biblical manuscript
 Textual criticism

References

Further reading 

 Giovanni Lami, De eruditione Apostolorum (Florence 1738), p. 232.

Greek New Testament minuscules
14th-century biblical manuscripts